This is a timeline of the history of BBC Two.

1960s

1962
The Pilkington Report on the future of broadcasting observed that ITV lacked any culturally relevant programming. It therefore decided that Britain's third television station should be awarded to the BBC.

1963
14 January – Michael Peacock is appointed the first Controller of the BBC's (forthcoming) second television channel. The designation of the new channel as BBC2 is also announced. Peacock is to assume his post on 4 February.

1964
4 January – Test transmissions begin for BBC2.
20 April – BBC2 starts broadcasting at 7:20pm, however, a power cut had affected its launch night.
21 April – The power had been restored to the Television Centre and programming began with Play School, at 11am and the launch schedule postponed from the night before, was successfully shown that evening at 7:20pm, also in reference to the power cut, the transmission opened with a shot of a candle which was then blown out by presenter Denis Tuohy.
22 August – The first Match of the Day airs on BBC2. The following episodes moved to BBC1.
6 December – The channel goes on air in the Midlands and East Anglia, because the Sutton Coldfield transmitter initially could not relay BBC2 beyond an area reception to the Midlands region, resulting in a staggered signal.
16 December – First episode of The Likely Lads is broadcast.

1965
9 January – Not Only... But Also debuts on BBC2.
4 March – David Attenborough becomes the channel's new Controller in succession to Michael Peacock, who becomes Controller of BBC1. Attenborough remains in the post until 1968.
 2 May – Sunday Cricket is broadcast for the first time. The programme, which runs throughout the afternoon on BBC2, features full coverage of a match "played under knock-out rules".
12 September – BBC2 Wales goes on the air. To introduce the service, BBC2 airs a programme titled BBC-2 Comes to Wales, featuring the Secretary of State for Wales James Griffiths, the Lord Mayor of Cardiff, the Deputy Mayor of Newport, Chairman of the Broadcasting Council for Wales Professor Glanmor Williams, David Attenborough, and BBC2 Wales Controller Alun Oldfield-Davies.
31 October – BBC2 in the North of England goes on the air.

1966
1 January – The first edition of Rugby Special is broadcast, showing weekly highlights of rugby union matches.
15 January – BBC2 goes on air in the South and West of England.
5 April – The Money Programme debuts on BBC2. It continued to air until 2010. 
11 June – BBC2 Northern Ireland goes on the air.
9 July – BBC2 Scotland goes on the air, although much of England and some parts of Wales, Scotland and Northern Ireland still cannot receive the channel.
2 October – The four-part drama Talking to a Stranger by John Hopkins, recounts a weekend's tragic events from the perspectives of each of the four main participants, begins transmission in the Theatre 625 series. Two of the leads were Judi Dench and Maurice Denham.

1967

1 January – Debut of the BBC's adaptation of John Galsworthy's The Forsyte Saga on BBC2. The series concludes on 1 July.
1 July – BBC2 becomes Europe's first colour TV broadcaster. The colour service is launched with live coverage from the Wimbledon Championships.
23 October – BBC2 broadcasts the BBC's first bulletin of Service Information.
2 December – Colour television is officially launched on BBC2 which coincided with a new ident known as Cube 2.

1968
2 September – The Morecambe & Wise Show debuts. The comedy duo had contracted to the BBC to be able to broadcast in colour.

1969
23 February – First episode of Civilisation, written and presented by the art historian Sir Kenneth Clark, is  broadcast. The 13 part series concludes in May.
24 March – Debut of the surreal comedy sketch show Q, written by Spike Milligan and Neil Shand, and starring Milligan.

1970s

1970
1 January – The first episode of The Six Wives of Henry VIII is broadcast with Keith Michell in the lead. The six-part series is a sequence of television plays written by six writers.

1971
3 January – The first Open University broadcast is aired on BBC2.
17 February – BBC2 airs Elizabeth R, a drama serial of six 85-minute plays starring Glenda Jackson in the title role.
21 September – The Old Grey Whistle Test premieres on BBC2.

1972
 8 January – Ways of Seeing, a four-part series written and presented by John Berger, begins.
12 November – The first episode of America: A Personal History of the United States, a thirteen–part series written and presented by Alistair Cooke, is broadcast.

1973
5 May – The Ascent of Man, written and presented by Jacob Bronowski, begins its thirteen-part run .
24 August – BBC2 broadcast a trade test colour film for the final time, having done so during daytime closedowns to provide colour broadcasting in these intervals for use by television shops and engineers (the 'trade') to adjust their television sets.

1974
30 January – BBC2 shows the first early morning Open University programming, airing between 6:40am and 7:30am.
22 February – BBC2 airs the drama Girl as part of its Second City Firsts anthology series. The drama, which tells the story of an affair between two army officers, is the first on British television to feature a gay kiss, between two women.
5 December – Party Political Broadcast, the final episode of Monty Python's Flying Circus, is broadcast on BBC2.
28 December – BBC2 launches a new ident known as the Striped 2.

1975
January – When not broadcasting actual programmes, BBC2 begins to fully close down on weekdays between 11:30am and 4pm and continues to do so until September 1983.
22 January–26 February – Drama series The Love School, about the Pre-Raphaelite Brotherhood is shown on BBC2. 
19 September – The comedy series Fawlty Towers debuts on BBC2. The second series would air 4 years later.
1 October – The first episode of the long-running documentary series Arena airs.
Service Information is now broadcast once a day rather than three times a day.

1976
20 September – The twelve-part serial I, Claudius begins.

1977
25 October – The first series of Ripping Yarns, written by Michael Palin and Terry Jones, begins. A pilot episode was broadcast in January 1976.
22 December – Count Dracula stars Louis Jourdan in a television adaptation of the Bram Stoker novel. It was directed by Philip Saville.

1978
6 April – The four-part drama series Law & Order begins airing on BBC2. Each of the four stories within the series is told from a different perspective, including that of the Detective, the Villain, the Brief and the Prisoner. The series proves to be controversial at the time due to its depiction of a corrupt British law enforcement and legal system.
13 July – The original series of Top Gear begins airing on BBC2 having started as a locally produced programme at BBC Pebble Mill the previous year.
31 October – Empire Road is first broadcast. It was, according to the BFI's Screenonline website, "the first serious attempt at a long-running drama on British television addressing Britain's growing multi-racial society." It runs for sixteen episodes over two series ending in October 1979.

1979
2 January – BBC2 broadcasts the first in Michael Wood's documentary history series, In Search of the Dark Ages.
June – BBC2 launches the world's first computer-generated ident, the BBC Two 'Computer Generated 2'.
25 October – The final episode of the comedy series Fawlty Towers is broadcast on BBC2.

1980s

1980
28 January – The first edition of Newsnight is broadcast on BBC2. Its launch had been delayed for four months by the Association of Broadcasting Staff, at the time the main BBC trade union.
25 February – The first episode of the political sitcom Yes Minister, "Open Government", is broadcast by BBC2.
March – The very first in-vision Ceefax transmissions are broadcast. These consist of 30-minute transmissions which BBC2 broadcasts on weekdays between 10am and 10:30am and between 3:30pm and 4pm. 
 6 September – BBC2 launches a computer generated clock, probably the first of its kind in the world.

1981
5 January – The Hitchhiker's Guide to the Galaxy, the television version of Douglas Adams' radio comedy of the same name debuts on BBC2.
20 January – BBC2 airs live coverage of the inauguration of Ronald Reagan as the 40th President of the United States.
17 May – Sunday Grandstand launches. It broadcasts during the Summer months on BBC2. The programme includes weekly coverage of Sunday Cricket which had been shown on BBC2 since 1965.
23 October – The last ever teatime block of Open University programmes are transmitted. From 1982 onwards, only a single Open University programme is aired and is billed in TV listings as a general programme rather than an Open University programme. This allows the channel to begin weeknight programmes at 5:35pm throughout the year instead of just before 7pm. The displaced OU programmes are moved to a late night slot, broadcast after the conclusion of regular programmes.
November – BBC2 starts its weekdays at the earlier time of 3:55pm.

1982
 15 April – BBC2's start time moves to the later time of 5:10pm with transmissions beginning with a single Open University programme with regular programmes now beginning at 5:40pm.
10 October – Boys from the Blackstuff premieres on BBC2 with the last episode shown on 7 November.
9 November – The first edition of the anarchic sitcom The Young Ones starring Rik Mayall is transmitted on BBC2.
23 December – At 10:30am, Service Information is broadcast on BBC2 for the final time.

1983
2 May – From this day, Ceefax pages are broadcast during all daytime downtime although BBC2 continues to fully close down for four hours after Play School ends. 
27–28 August – BBC2 Rocks Around the Clock by broadcasting non-stop music programmes all day and also all night.
16 September 
Play School is broadcast on BBC2 for the final time.
BBC2 closes down during the day for the final time, all future daytime downtime is filled by Pages from Ceefax.
19 September – Daytime on Two launches on BBC2. Broadcasting during term-time from just after 9am until 3pm, the strand encompasses the BBC Schools programming previously shown on BBC1 and the BBC's adult educational programmes which are shown at lunchtime. A special version of the BBC Two 'Computer Generated 2' ident is launched to introduce the programmes.
 5 December – Following the end of the Daytime on Two term, Ceefax is shown non-stop throughout the day on BBC2 for the first time with transmissions running continuously from around 9am until the start of programmes at 5:35pm.

1984
28–29 July – BBC2 hosts Jazz on a Summer's Day, a weekend of programmes devoted to jazz music.
25–26 August – For the second time, BBC2 goes Rock Around the Clock.
23 September – British single TV drama play Threads premiered on BBC2. It was repeated on 1 August 1985 on BBC2 as part of the After the Bomb series.
5 October – BBC2 broadcasts an Open University programme at teatime for the final time.
8 October – BBC2 launches a full afternoon service, consisting primarily of repeats of Dallas and old feature films.
 December – BBC2 stops broadcasting a late evening Saturday night news summary, meaning that the channel now only transmits a single 15 minute news and sport bulletin on Saturdays.

1985
7 January – The BBC ends its experiment with afternoon broadcasting and from this date Ceefax pages are shown continuously on BBC2 between 9:00am and 5:25pm apart from when Daytime on Two is in season and when sporting events are being shown.
11 January – BBC2 debuts Victoria Wood as Seen on TV.
10 April – An eight-part dramatisation of Charles Dickens' novel Bleak House begins.
28 April – The World Snooker Championship Final between Dennis Taylor and Steve Davis draws BBC2's highest ever rating of 18.5 million viewers.
13 July – Live Aid pop concerts are held in Philadelphia and London and televised around the world. Over £50 million is raised for famine relief in Ethiopia. BBC2 shows the London concert with the Philadelphia concert shown on BBC1.
27 July – BBC2 airs "Blues Night", an Arena special dedicated to the Blues and featuring artists from the genre, including Sonny Boy Williamson, B. B. King, Blind John Davis, and Big Bill Broonzy.
30 July – Debut of the pop music culture series No Limits on BBC2.
31 July – The War Game, made for the BBC's The Wednesday Play strand in 1965 but banned from broadcast at the time is finally shown on television as part of BBC2's After the Bomb season.

1986
30 March – BBC2 begins using the TWO ident which is used until 16 February 1991.
21 May – A Very Peculiar Practice debuts on BBC2.
2 September – Ahead of the launch of all-day television on BBC1, the weekly magazine programme for Asian women, Gharbar transfers back to BBC2. The programme moves to a new day and a new slot, 9am on Tuesdays.
9 September – The last ever non-stop all-day BBC2 Ceefax transmission takes place.
20–21 September – For the third and final time, BBC2 goes Rock Around the Clock.
 Autumn – BBC2 launches regional versions of  Rugby Special so that each nation can receiver fuller coverage of games from their country.
14 October – BBC2 begins regular late afternoon programming by showing a film during the second half of the gap between the end of Daytime on Two and the start of the evening's programmes.
17 October – BBC2 broadcasts a teatime news summary with subtitles for the last time. For the past 3 years this bulletin, which had been broadcast at around 5:25pm, had been the first programme of the day, apart from educational programmes and sports coverage.
27 October – The BBC launches its daytime television service and BBC2 provides a full afternoon service for the first time. However, when Daytime on Two was not being shown, BBC2 continues to broadcast Pages from Ceefax and does not start broadcasting until 2pm. It wasn't until 1989 that BBC2 started to show morning programmes when Daytime on Two was not on the air.
8 December – Six weeks after launching its daytime service, BBC TV starts broadcasting hourly news summaries. BBC2 broadcasts three early afternoon bulletins at 2pm, 3pm and 3:50pm with the latter being followed by the mid-afternoon regional news summary which had been transferred from BBC1 on 27 October. Each bulletin is followed by a weather forecast.

1987
28 April – BBC television programming in Hindi and Urdu finishes after more than 20 years following the transmission of the final edition of Gharbar. It is replaced by a new English language programme for the Asian community.
22 June – The BBC's lunchtime children's programme moves from BBC1 to BBC2. It is shown slightly earlier at 1:20pm.
25 July – The BBC's new television programme for the Asian community, Network East, launches. The 40 minute programme is broadcast on Saturday afternoons.
30 September – BBC2 debuts Malcolm McKay's screenplay The Interrogation of John, a film concerning the police questioning of a potential murder suspect. Starring Dennis Quilley, Bill Paterson and Michael Fitzgerald, it later forms the first of a three part series titled A Wanted Man which further develops the story and airs in 1989.
 11 October – A new Sunday morning children's strand Now on Two launches. It is broadcast between October and January during the during the Open University off-season.
31 December – BBC2 airs a 5 hour Whistle Test special to welcome in 1988. The special, aired from 9:35pm on New Year's Eve to 2:55am on New Year's Day, takes a look back through the archives in what is the programme's final outing. until 31 years later in 2018 before a new edition of the programme is broadcast.

1988
15 February – Red Dwarf makes its debut on BBC2.
25 March – BBC2 shows Two of Us, a gay-themed television film. It was produced as part of the BBC Schools SCENE series and intended for young adults. It confronted the Thatcherite government's attempt to ban gay sex education in schools via the controversial and since repealed section 28 legislation. Given this backdrop, the BBC opted not to show it during the day and it was screened late at night on this day, even though it was originally created for a school audience. In 1990, the play was finally shown during the day when it was broadcast in a lunchtime slot.
9 May – The youth strand DEF II is launched on BBC2.
11 June – The Nelson Mandela 70th Birthday Tribute concert is staged at Wembley Stadium, London which was broadcast to 67 countries and an audience of 600 million.
16 September – BBC2 broadcasts programmes for the Open University on weekday lunchtimes for the final time.

1989
16 January – The Late Show, Britain's first daily television arts programme which is presented by Sarah Dunant debuts on BBC2 directly after Newsnight.
20 January – BBC2 airs live coverage of the inauguration of George Bush as the 41st President of the United States.
2 March – First transmission of My Brother David, an edition of the BBC2 schools series Scene in which Simon Scarboro talks about the life of his brother, David Scarboro who originally played the EastEnders character Mark Fowler who fell to his death from Beachy Head in 1988. The programme is repeated again on 19 June for a general audience as part of BBC2's DEF II strand.
21 April – BBC2's 25th anniversary. Programming includes an edition of Arena in which the author Graham Greene sets out to trace a namesake who posed as him for many years and an edition of The Late Show which looks at the early BBC2 jazz programme Jazz 625.
19 June 
 For the first time, BBC2 broadcasts during the morning when not showing Daytime on Two with weekday programmes beginning at 10am, as opposed to lunchtime.
 My Brother David, first shown on 2 March is repeated as part of BBC2's DEF II strand. 
25 September – BBC2 airs The Interrogation of John, Malcolm McKay's 1987 screenplay starring Dennis Quilley, Bill Paterson and Michael Fitzgerald. The film, about the police questioning of a murder suspect and first shown in 1987, now forms the first of a three part series titled A Wanted Man which further develops the story. The second part of the trilogy, The Secret, airs on 27 September, while Shoreland concludes the series on 28 September.
4 October – Jeremy Paxman makes his first appearance as presenter of BBC2's Newsnight, he would host it until 2014. 
21 November – Television coverage of proceedings in the House of Commons begins and the BBC's parliamentary coverage shown on BBC2.
22 November – Following the commencement of televised coverage of the House of Commons the previous day, BBC2 launches a breakfast round-up of yesterday's proceedings. This is preceded by the 8am bulletin from Breakfast News. Previously, the only BBC2 breakfast output was programmes from the Open University. Open University programmes continue to be shown on BBC2 at breakfast but in an earlier timeslot.

1990s

1990
2 February – The BBC Schools Scene gay-themed television film Two of Us is given its first daytime showing on BBC2. The channel had opted to show it late at night at the time of its previous broadcast in March 1988.
13 February – The US science fiction series Quantum Leap makes its British television debut on BBC2.
14 April – BBC2 begins showing the 94-part 1988 Indian serial, Mahabharat, a dramatisation of the epic poem the Mahabharata. The programme is shown in Hindi with English subtitles.
3 October – The BBC Radio 1 comedy series The Mary Whitehouse Experience comes to television with a series on BBC2.
23 October – David Lynch's critically acclaimed serial drama Twin Peaks receives its British television debut at 9pm on BBC2.
30 October – Debut of The Sentence, an eight-part BBC2 documentary series looking at life inside Glen Parva Young Offenders Institute near Leicester, Europe's largest prison of its type. It is the first time a television crew has been given access to the prison.
7 December – BBC2 broadcasts Your Move, a pioneering interactive show in which the home audience are invited to play chess against grandmaster Jonathan Speelman using telephone voting to select each move.

1991

14 January – American television sitcom The Fresh Prince of Bel-Air is broadcast in the United Kingdom for the first time, making its debut on BBC2 as part of the DEF II programming strand.
18 January – BBC2 airs a special edition of Arena in which playwright Arthur Miller meets ANC leader Nelson Mandela. In the film Mandela talks for the first time about his life and experiences from a personal standpoint.
12 February – A year after the release of Nelson Mandela from prison, BBC2 airs an edition of its Assignment documentary strand in which journalist Donald Woods returns to South Africa to give his personal assessment of that country's future.
15 February – The BBC2 'TWO' ident is seen for the final time after nearly five years in use.
16 February – BBC1 and BBC2 receive new idents, both generated from laserdisc and featuring the BBC corporate logo introduced in 1986. BBC1 features a numeral '1' encased in a globe and BBC2 features eleven idents based around a numeral '2'.
18 June – BBC2 airs the concluding episode of David Lynch's offbeat drama, Twin Peaks.
20 June – An edition of BBC2's The Late Show is the final programme to be broadcast from the BBC's Lime Grove Studios.
30 July – Debut of Australian children's television series for pre-schoolers Johnson and Friends on BBC2.
26 August – BBC2 airs a day of programmes paying tribute to the Lime Grove Studios, which includes a remake of the 1950s soap opera The Grove Family featuring actors from the present day.
17 September – Comedy series Bottom starring Rik Mayall and Adrian Edmondson debuts on BBC2.
20 September – BBC2 begins a rerun of Gerry Anderson's 1960s television series Thunderbirds. The series proves to be popular, leading to a shortage of Tracy Island toys in stores during the run up to Christmas 1991, something that prompts the children's television series, Blue Peter to show viewers and their parents how to make their own Tracy Island model. An instruction sheet produced by the programme receives more than 100,000 requests.
21 December – BBC2 airs A Perfect Christmas, featuring the best of Christmas programming from the BBC archives. Shows include festive episodes of The Flower Pot Men, Dr. Finlay's Casebook, and the 1986 Christmas Day episodes of EastEnders.
28 December – BBC2 shows the network television premiere of Hail! Hail! Rock 'n' Roll, Taylor Hackford's acclaimed documentary celebrating Chuck Berry's 60th birthday, with footage of two concerts from 1986.

1992
4 January – BBC2 airs Freddie Mercury: a Tribute, a special programme introduced by Elton John and that celebrates the life and work of Freddie Mercury, who died in November 1991.
21 January – BBC Select launches overnight on BBC1 and BBC2 as a subscription service showing specialist programmes for professionals including businessmen, lawyers, teachers and nurses. The service ends in 1995.
20 April – The Freddie Mercury Tribute Concert for AIDS Awareness, an open-air concert in tribute to the late Freddie Mercury is held at London's Wembley Stadium. The concert is broadcast on BBC2 in the UK and televised worldwide.
31 August – BBC2 spends the evening in TV Hell.
8 October – BBC2 airs the first edition of Later... with Jools Holland. Artists and groups featuring on this edition are The Neville Brothers, The Christians, Nu Colours and D'Influence.
12 November – The first episode of Absolutely Fabulous, a sitcom written by and starring Jennifer Saunders, airs on BBC2. The series also features Joanna Lumley, Julia Sawalha, Jane Horrocks and June Whitfield. Subsequent series would air on BBC1.
28 December – As part of a theme night devoted to (rival) broadcaster Granada Television, BBC2 airs the first new edition of University Challenge in five years. The programme returns for a full series two years later, presented by Jeremy Paxman.
30 December – BBC2 airs Unplugged – Eric Clapton, in which Eric Clapton plays acoustic versions of some of his tracks.

1993
20 January – BBC2 airs live coverage of the inauguration of Bill Clinton as the 42nd President of the United States.
15 February – BBC2 airs Oprah Winfrey's interview with singer Michael Jackson.
4 April – Children's BBC begin to repeat the children's drama series Grange Hill from its first series in 1978, on Sunday mornings on BBC2, as part of the show's 15th anniversary celebrations. These repeats end in 1999 with series 16, Prior to the repeats, Rugrats begins showing on the same date.
17 April – Arena presents a new 4 part series "Tales of Rock 'N' Roll" on BBC2 looking at the story of 4 rock songs of how they came about and the history behind them and who and what they involved. Starting with Peggy Sue who was tracked down in Sacramento, California to be found running her own drain-clearing company Rapid Rooter and then to be taken back to Lubbock, Texas to recall how she knew Buddy Holly and how her marriage to drummer Jerry Allison turned out. Heartbreak Hotel where the song came to be written after the 2 songwriters discovered an article about a suicide in a hotel in Miami after reading about it in the Miami Herald. Walk on the Wild Side looks at all the characters that were involved in the song and how Lou Reed used to spend time at Andy Warhol's studio where they all did (Holly Woodlawn & Joe Dallesandro were the only ones still around to tell the tale) and Highway 61 Revisited which looked at Bob Dylan's roots and everything that was connected with U.S. Route 61. The series ran for four weeks on Saturday nights on 17 April, 24 April, 1 May and 8 May.
20 October – Kirsty Wark debuts as anchor on BBC2's Newsnight.
26 December – The Wrong Trousers, the second short film starring Wallace and Gromit, premieres on BBC2.
31 December – BBC2 airs the first Hootenanny, an annual New Year's Eve music show hosted by Jools Holland. The show includes performances from Sting, the Gipsy Kings and Sly and Robbie.

1994
2 January – BBC2 begins a repeat run of the 1960s US television series The Fugitive.
10 January – The Welsh language soap opera Pobol y Cwm makes its debut in the rest of the UK when BBC2 begins airing episodes daily from Mondays to Thursdays. The series was, shown with English subtitles, aired on BBC2 for three months, and on an experimental basis.
4 March – BBC2 shows the network television premiere of Laurel Avenue, the acclaimed US miniseries that tells the story of an eventful weekend in the lives of an extended African American family living in St. Paul, Minnesota. The second part is aired on 6 March.
16 April – BBC2 celebrates its 30th birthday (four days early) with an evening of programmes selected and introduced by former controller David Attenborough. Among them are episodes of Elizabeth R and The Barry Humphries Show, a 1967 documentary about politics in India and a new episode of Call My Bluff.
2 May – BBC2 airs Cry Freedom, Richard Attenborough's acclaimed film about South African journalist Donald Woods.
23 May – The BBC2 youth strand DEF II comes to an end after six years.
27 August – BBC2 presents a night of programming dedicated to ATV.
17 September – BBC2 airs the first edition of Top of the Pops 2, a programme showing footage from present day editions of Top of the Pops, as well as material from the series' archive.
19 September – The BBC launches a weekday lunchtime business, personal finance and consumer news programme. Called Working Lunch, the programme is broadcast on BBC2 for 42 weeks each year.
21 September – University Challenge returns after a seven year absence and two years after a special edition was shown, the revived series has Jeremy Paxman as host and would present until 2023.
18 November – Debut of The Trial, a series of documentaries aired on BBC2, which were filmed largely inside Scottish courts in 1993 and early 1994. Filming of the series is possible because Criminal Justice Act 1925, the legislation banning photography in British courts does not apply in Scotland.
17 December – BBC2 begins a season of films starring Burt Lancaster following his death in October. The season opens with Elmer Gantry, a 1960 film in which Lancaster stars alongside Jean Simmons.

1995
29 January – Start of BBC2's weekly roundup of proceedings in the O. J. Simpson murder trial with The Trial of O. J. Simpson.
15 February – As part of the Modern Times series BBC2 airs Death on Request, a Dutch documentary showing a doctor giving a terminally-ill patient a lethal injection of drugs. The programme is criticised by groups opposed to euthanasia.
25 February – BBC2 airs a documentary about The Rev. W. Awdry called The Thomas the Tank Engine Man as part of their Bookmark series. The documentary is narrated by Hilary Fortnam, Awdry's daughter and includes a look at Thomas merchandise, the success of Thomas, images from the original Railway Series books with stock narration by John Gielgud, interviews with several people such as The Reverend himself, fans of Thomas, Awdry's son Christopher, children's author and poet Michael Rosen, various people who worked on the books and toys, Brian Sibley who also wrote the Reverend's autobiography, the people behind the television broadcasts and rights of Thomas in Japan and the producers of the television series Britt Allcroft and David Mitton, plus a special behind the scenes peek of the 100th episode Thomas and the Special Letter and the Reverend criticizing the series 3 episode Henry's Forest.
29 June – Debut of Gaytime TV on BBC 2, the BBC's first gay magazine programme.
8 October – BBC2 airs the final edition of The Trial of O. J. Simpson as coverage of the trial draws to a conclusion.
12 November – BBC2 airs Twin Peaks: Fire Walk with Me, David Lynch's 1992 prequel to the acclaimed television series Twin Peaks. The film stars Sheryl Lee, Ray Wise and Kyle MacLachlan.
24 December – A Close Shave, the third short film starring Wallace and Gromit, premieres on BBC2.

1996
15 January–11 March – Our Friends in the North, a critically acclaimed nine-part serial spanning the 1960s to the 1990s in the lives of four friends, is shown on BBC2. 
10 June–23 August – For the Summer period, the late afternoon block of children's programmes aired on BBC1 are transferred to BBC2.
19 July–4 August – The BBC provides full live coverage of the 1996 Olympic Games. The majority of the coverage is broadcast on BBC1 although two hours at peaktime is shown on BBC2. Also, for the first time, the BBC provides alternative live action during the overnight hours on BBC2.
24 November – The American animated series The Simpsons begins airing on BBC2 with the episode There's No Disgrace Like Home which aired on BBC1 the previous evening.

1997

14 January – Viewing figures released for 1996 indicate BBC1 and BBC2 as the only terrestrial channels to increase their audience share during the year.
31 March – Children's television series Teletubbies premieres on BBC2.
10 June – BBC2 airs the television documentary Homeground: An Exile's Return, telling the story of Martin McGartland, a former British agent who infiltrated the Provisional Irish Republican Army.
31 August – BBC2 simulcasts BBC1's rolling news coverage of the death of Diana, Princess of Wales. BBC2 breaks away at 3pm to provide alternative programming.
6 September – BBC2 provides in-vision signing of the funeral of Diana, Princess of Wales.
10 September – BBC Two begins airing the six-part documentary series The Nazis: A Warning from History which examines the rise and fall of the Nazi Party in Germany. The final part is aired on 15 October.
4 October – To coincide with the introduction of the network's new corporate logo, the channel is now officially known as BBC Two rather than BBC2. The idents are unchanged but does feature some new versions. 
19 October – BBC Two shows Steven Spielberg's 1993 Oscar-winning drama Schindler's List, a film based on the novel Schindler's Ark by Thomas Keneally. The film is followed by an interview with Spielberg and a profile of Oskar Schindler.

1998
Early in 1998, BBC2 stops shutting down its transmitters when it isn't broadcasting the BBC Learning Zone. Instead, BBC2 broadcasts Pages from Ceefax during all overnight downtime.
20 February – Debut of Robot Wars on BBC Two.
21 March – BBC Two airs Richard Eyre's television version of his Royal National Theatre production of King Lear in the Performance series. It stars Ian Holm in the eponymous role, as well as Barbara Flynn, Amanda Redman and Victoria Hamilton as Lear's daughters.
7 June – To mark the tenth anniversary of the death of Russell Harty, BBC Two airs You Are, Are You Not, Russell Harty?, a documentary paying tribute to the chat show presenter.
12 August – BBC Two announce plans for an evening of programmes dedicated to the Helen Fielding novel Bridget Jones's Diary and issues raised in the book for later in the year.
19 September – BBC Two airs a special Bee Gees edition of TOTP2.
10 October – BBC Two airs Blue Peter Night, a selection of programmes celebrating 40 years of the long-running children's series Blue Peter.
20 October – A new late night programme review of the day's events in Westminster, Despatch Box, is launched. It replaces The Midnight Hour.
26 October – Ads Infinitum debuts on BBC Two.
17 December – Jane Root is appointed Controller of BBC Two, becoming the first female head of a BBC channel. She will replace the outgoing incumbent, Mark Thompson in January 1999.
29 December – BBC Two airs a special edition of TOTP2 dedicated to glam rock.

1999
11 January – The black comedy show The League of Gentlemen debuts on BBC Two. Along with The Fast Show and Goodness Gracious Me, it is credited with boosting international interest in British comedy series.
7 March – BBC Two airs the final episode of the 1993 series of Grange Hill, concluding a Sunday morning rerun of the first 16 series of the school drama which began in April 1993.
26 March – Debut of As the Crow Flies, a seven-part BBC Two series in which Janet Street-Porter sets out to walk the 350 miles between the Edinburgh and Greenwich observatories.
29 April – The Planets, an eight-part documentary series exploring the Solar System, debuts on BBC Two.
24 July – Goodness Gracious Me Night, an evening of programming dedicated to the Asian comedy sketch show Goodness Gracious Me airs on BBC Two.
27 August – The BBC names Gordon Brewer and Anne Mackenzie as the presenters of Newsnight Scotland, BBC Two's forthcoming Newsnight opt-out for Scottish viewers.
6 September – The children's programme Tweenies makes its debut on BBC2 at 10:30am and again at 3:25pm on BBC1.
4 October – Launch of Newsnight Scotland, the BBC Scotland opt-out of the main Newsnight programme on BBC Two.
7 October – Gimme Some Truth, a 56-minute documentary featuring unseen footage of John Lennon is set to be aired on British television. Work was recently completed on the project, but a deal to broadcast it is yet to be agreed. The film is ultimately shown on BBC Two on 13 February 2000.
24 October – Debut of the BBC Two documentary series, Playing the Race Card which looks at the history of race and immigration in the United Kingdom.
27 October – BBC Two airs the 150th edition of TOTP2.
16 November – BBC Two begins rerunning episodes of Doctor Who, beginning with the first episode of the 1970 adventure Spearhead from Space.
8 December – BBC Two airs a special edition of TOTP2 featuring performances by Canadian country singer Shania Twain.

2000s

2000
17 January – BBC Two begins a four-part adaptation of Gormenghast, Mervyn Peake's series of fantasy novels. The series, starring Jonathan Rhys Meyers is launched with a massive publicity campaign, but is panned by critics and loses 40% of its viewership by the third episode. Figures indicate that the first episode is watched by 4.2 million, a healthy audience for a BBC Two programme, but that by the third episode, aired on 31 January, this has fallen to 2.5 million.
13 February – BBC Two airs Gimme Some Truth, a documentary featuring footage of John Lennon as he recorded his 1971 album Imagine.
22 July – The ten part popular culture series I Love the '70s debuts on BBC Two, with I Love 1970. With each edition dedicated to a different year of the decade, the series concludes on 23 September with I Love 1979.
14 August – The Weakest Link begins on BBC Two.

2001

13 January – Debut of the ten-part BBC Two series I Love the '80s which examines the pop culture of the 1980s. The series debuts with I Love 1980, and concludes on 24 March with I Love 1989.
20 January – BBC Two airs live coverage of the inauguration of George W. Bush as the 43rd President of the United States.
15 August – Unveiling its autumn schedule, the BBC announces that ten-part World War II drama, Band of Brothers will air on BBC Two, instead of BBC One as originally planned. The broadcaster says the decision to move the series is to allow "an uninterrupted 10-week run" and not because it was considered not to be mainstream enough.
18 August – Debut of the ten-part BBC Two series I Love the '90s which examines the pop culture of the 1990s. The series begins with I Love 1990 and concludes on 3 November with I Love 1999.
26 September – BBC Two airs a special edition of TOTP2 featuring a live concert from Elton John.
5 November – BBC 2W is launched, broadcasting on digital services in Wales on weekday evenings.
14 November – BBC Two announces that the current 1991 idents are to be axed and be replaced by a new set of four computer generated idents on 19 November.
19 November – BBC Two introduces a new set of four computer generated idents at 7:00am, replacing the previous set of over 20 (four of which dating back to 1991). ITV2 rebrands on the same day.

2002
2 March – BBC Knowledge ceases transmission in the early hours of the morning (the first BBC channel to permanently close) with BBC Four launching to replace it at 7:00pm. The opening night is simulcast on BBC Two.
3 March – The acclaimed US spy drama 24, starring Kiefer Sutherland as agent Jack Bauer makes its British television debut on BBC Two.
6 June – BBC Two begins showing The Hunt for Britain's Paedophiles, a three-part documentary series following investigations by Scotland Yard's specialist Paedophile Unit. The programme proves to be controversial, even before going on air, as it is reported that after spending two years shadowing investigators, many members of the production team required counselling to deal with their exposure to the things witnessed by the unit's detectives. Executive producer Bob Long defends the programme, saying he hopes it will lead to better policing of the crime. The series concludes on 20 June.
20 October – BBC Two's motoring series Top Gear is relaunched with a brand new format.
24 November – Sir Winston Churchill is voted the Greatest Briton of all time by viewers of BBC Two's 100 Greatest Britons.
 20 December – The final editions of Westminster Live and Despatch Box are broadcast.

2003
 8 January – As a result of the review of the BBC's political output, coverage of politics is relaunched resulting in the launch of Daily Politics.
11 January – Steven Spielberg's science-fiction miniseries Taken debuts on BBC Two.
6 February – Prime Minister Tony Blair appears on BBC Two's Newsnight with Jeremy Paxman and a live audience where he is questioned about the Iraq crisis. Blair is also taken aback when Paxman asks him about his Christian faith and whether he and US President George W. Bush have prayed together.
9 February – After a long delay, BBC Choice is replaced by BBC Three. The opening night is simulcast on BBC Two.
5 April – BBC Two launches The Big Read, a nationwide search for Britain's favourite book. The project is designed to encourage the nation to read while people will be asked to vote for their favourite novel.
17 May – Following a public vote to find the UK's favourite book, the BBC's The Big Read reveals the top 100 in a special programme on BBC Two.
15 October – BBC Two airs the documentary When Michael Portillo Became a Single Mum in which former Defence Secretary Michael Portillo assumes the mantle of Merseyside single mother Jenny Miner for a week.
5 December – The third series of US spy drama 24 will not air on BBC Two after negotiations between Fox and the BBC ended without a deal being reached.
13 December – J. R. R. Tolkien's The Lord of the Rings trilogy wins the BBC's The Big Read after receiving 23% of the vote.
16 December – BBC Two airs a special two-act edition of TOTP2 featuring performances from Fleetwood Mac and James Brown.
26 December – Debut of That Was the Week We Watched on BBC Two, narrated by actor Simon Pegg and showing six nights a week (except on New Year's Eve) to looking back the past television shows for the Radio Times and TVTimes schedules from the years 1967, 1970, 1973, 1977, 1982 and 1986. The series continues on New Year's Day 2004.

2004
29 March – BBC Two Controller Jane Root will leave her role to take up a position with the Discovery Network in the United States, it is reported.
13 April – BBC Two airs the television debut of Hawking, a drama about the life and work of theoretical physicist Professor Stephen Hawking, and which stars Benedict Cumberbatch in the title role.
19 April – Tots TV begins screenings on CBeebies and BBC Two. These broadcasts continue until 2009.
20 April – BBC Two celebrates 40 years on air by broadcasting Happy Birthday BBC Two.
7 May – The Simpsons is broadcast on BBC Two for the final time, as the show moves to Channel 4 on 5 November. 
14 May – BBC Four Controller Roly Keating is appointed to succeed Jane Root as Controller of BBC Two.
4 October – UK television debut of the US version of The Apprentice with Donald Trump on BBC Two. The UK version with Alan Sugar would debut on 16 February 2005.
29 November – The BBC announces that Top of the Pops will move from its Friday evening BBC One slot to BBC Two where it will air on Sunday evenings.
2 December – BBC Two unveils its winter season of programming which will include a major documentary, Auschwitz, to coincide with Holocaust Memorial Day.

2005
8 January – Jerry Springer: The Opera airs on BBC Two, despite protests from Christian Voice and other groups.
11 January – Debut of the six-part BBC Two documentary series Auschwitz: The Nazis and 'The Final Solution' which recounts the history of Auschwitz concentration camp. The final part is aired on 15 February.
27 January – Holocaust Memorial Day and the 60th anniversary of the liberation of Auschwitz concentration camp are observed in the UK. BBC Two and BBC News 24 air Auschwitz Remembered, a special news programme providing coverage of memorial events.
16 February – The first series of the UK version of The Apprentice debuts on BBC Two.
19 March – Ahead of the return of Doctor Who to BBC television later in the month, BBC Two airs a "Doctor Who Night", with three programmes celebrating the series.
17 July – After 41 years broadcasting on BBC One, music show Top of the Pops is switched to BBC Two due to declining audiences. This is not enough to save it and it is axed the following year.
19 September – The famous children's classic television character Muffin the Mule (who has disappeared from TV screens for a very long time) is back with a brand new 2D animated series on BBC Two.
26–27 September – No Direction Home, Martin Scorsese's documentary on Bob Dylan, receives its broadcast premiere on BBC Two in the UK, under the Arena banner.
 5 October – The 6am CBeebies programming block on BBC Two ends and is replaced by an hour of  Pages from Ceefax.
28 October – Sheffield based rock band Arctic Monkeys make their first appearance on BBC Two's Later...with Jools Holland.
21 December – The BBC is to trial a three-month experiment in which its Saturday morning schedules for BBC One and BBC Two will be swapped. The changes, taking effect from January 2006 are being implemented because of frequent scheduling changes caused by big events and breaking news stories and will mean children's programming will be absent from BBC One's Saturday morning lineup for the first time since 1976.

2006
20 June – The BBC announces that Top of the Pops will be axed, the final show airing on 30 July.
30 July – Top of the Pops airs its final regular edition after being axed earlier in the year. However, the show returns for a Christmas special.
16 October – The children's programme Numberjacks makes its debut on BBC2.
31 October – Pop star Madonna appears on Newsnight where she gives her first British television interview about her controversial adoption of an African baby.
17 November – Episode eight of Series D of QI is a Children in Need special with Alan Davies, Rich Hall, Jonathan Ross and Phill Jupitus, who discuss the topic of Descendants with presenter Stephen Fry.
16 December – At 5:30am BBC Two airs the final Open University course-related television broadcast. With Open University course content now available through media such as podcasts and DVDs it is no longer necessary for the programmes to be aired on television and radio. However, the Open University continues to make programming for a broader audience, with series including Coast, Child of Our Time and Battle of the Geeks.
25 December – The weekday 6am CBeebies programming block on BBC Two is reintroduced.

2007

28 January – BBC Two airs the final edition of Sunday Grandstand.
18 February – BBC Two launches 14 new idents designed by Abbott Mead Vickers BBDO and produced by Red Bee Media, with the "2" becoming a "Windows of the World" a portal through which the world is seen differently.
8 June – Adele Adkins, a 19-year-old singer from London makes her television debut on BBC Two's Later... with Jools Holland, performing her song "Daydreamer". She became one of the first artists to appear on the show without having released a record because producer Alison Howe booked her after hearing a demo tape. Adele's debut album, 19, is released in January 2008.
11 July – BBC Two debuts The Alastair Campbell Diaries, a series in which Campbell reads extracts from his memoirs over footage of key moments in the recently ended Blair government. The three part series is aired over three nights, concluding on 13 July.
17 October – The town of Whitehaven in Cumbria becomes the first place in the UK to lose their analogue television signals and start the digital switchover, starting with BBC Two. The other four channels are switched off on 14 November.

2008
22 July – BBC Two Controller Roly Keating is appointed as the BBC's first director of archive content. He will take up the role in the autumn.
1 October – BBC Four Controller Janice Hadlow is appointed Controller of BBC Two, replacing outgoing incumbent Roly Keating from November.
5 November – BBC Two airs a Newsnight special on the election of Barack Obama in which presenter Jeremy Paxman famously addresses the rapper Dizzee Rascal as "Mr Rascal".
19 November – QI broadcasts its last episode to be originally shown on BBC Two, as part of Children in Need. The series moves to BBC One during Christmas.

2009
2 January – BBC 2W closes as part of plans to achieve 3% savings at BBC Cymru Wales. Consequently, the digital version of BBC Two becomes a simulcast of BBC Two on analogue with fewer Wales opt-outs.
7 February – BBC Two screens the first part of Iran and the West, a landmark three-part documentary marking the 30th anniversary of the Iranian Revolution.
7 April – BBC Two suffers its second worse peak time viewing audience since 2001, with a share of 5.3%.

2010s

2010 
8 January – CBBC and CBeebies airs on BBC Two for the last time.
23 June – Following the previous day's emergency budget statement, David Cameron and Nick Clegg are questioned by a live audience on its potential impact. The programme Britain's Economy: Cameron and Clegg Face the Audience is presented by Nick Robinson and aired on the BBC News Channel and BBC Two. 
3 July – A brand new CBeebies pirate game show hosted by Annice Avey called SquashBuckle aired on CBBC at (7:00am to 7:25am and 1:00pm to 1:25pm) and BBC Two at (6:00am to 6:25am) from (3 July 2010 to 31 October 2010) before SquashBuckle moved to CBeebies in 2011.

2011
13 June – BBC Two airs the controversial documentary Choosing to Die, a film presented by Terry Pratchett which examines the topic of assisted suicide.
6 October – BBC Director General Mark Thompson announces that BBC HD will close to be replaced by a high definition simulcast of BBC Two. This BBC Two HD will work much the same way as BBC One HD. This move allows the corporation to save £2.1 million, used to count towards their budget deficit following the freezing of the license fee and the additional financial responsibility of addition services.

2012
18 January – A call by BBC Two's Stargazing Live for amateur astronomers to locate possible exoplanets, planets orbiting stars outside the Solar System, leads to the discovery of a new Neptune-sized exoplanet by two viewers, one in Peterborough. The planet is named Threapleton Holmes B in their honour.
12 March – BBC Two airs a programme in its This World strand concerning the Chinese television programme Interviews Before Execution in which death row inmates are interviewed by a reporter shortly before they are executed. Chinese authorities cancel the show following international interest generated by the documentary.
19 May – "Absent Friends", a fourth series episode of comedy Dad's Army, is repeated on BBC Two for the first time since its original broadcast in 1970. Previously, the episode was left out of repeat runs because of the controversial appearance of the Original IRA.
9 August – The BBC commissions a one-off drama to celebrate the 50th anniversary of Doctor Who. The film, An Adventure in Space and Time will tell the story of the team behind Doctor Whos creation and will air on BBC Two in 2013.
23 October – After 32 years, Pages from Ceefax is shown for the last time during downtime on BBC Two. To mark the occasion the last broadcast is introduced by the symbol the channel was using 32 years earlier, older music is played and a final special image is shown thanking viewers for watching. The Plain English Campaign gives the service a lifetime achievement award for its "clarity" and use of "everyday words".
28 October – Instead of launching a digital version of Pages from Ceefax, BBC Two starts showing This is BBC Two during its overnight downtime. This consists of a loop of trailers of forthcoming BBC Two programmes.

2013

26 March – BBC Two launches in high definition for the first time, two and a half years after BBC One did.
8 May – BBC Two Controller Janice Hadlow takes temporary control of BBC Four following the departure of Richard Klein to become head of ITV factual programming.
12 September – Debut of the period crime drama Peaky Blinders on BBC Two.

2014
5 February – Debut of the dark comedy anthology series Inside No. 9 on BBC Two.
6 February – The BBC announces Newsnight Scotland will end during 2014 and be replaced by Scotland 2014 as part of a shake up of BBC Scotland's referendum coverage. The final edition is broadcast on 22 May.
 7–23 February – The BBC gives over BBC Two to non-stop coverage of the 2014 Winter Olympics with live action shown continuously from around 5am until mid-evening and this is followed by a one-hour highlights programme.
15 February – Janice Hadlow will step down as joint Controller of BBC Two and BBC Four to take up a new role in charge of "special projects and seasons" at the BBC.
11 April – Kim Shillinglaw is named Controller of BBC Two and BBC Four, replacing Janice Hadlow.
20 April – 50th anniversary of the launch of BBC Two.
30 April – Jeremy Paxman announces he will leave Newsnight in June after 25 years with the programme.
2 May – BBC Two's Newsnight appoints The Guardian newspaper's investigations editor, Nick Hopkins as its investigations correspondent.
18 June – Jeremy Paxman leaves Newsnight after 25 years of news broadcasting but he continues to host University Challenge. 
8 July – BBC Two brings back the 1991–2001 idents (based around a sans-serif '2') for the channel's 50th anniversary. Since then, the idents have become permanent and will air into 2015 and beyond until they were replaced with new idents in September 2018. 
4 August – The BBC broadcast a series of memorial events in Great Britain and Belgium marking 100 years since Britain's entry into the First World War. BBC Two broadcasts a memorial service at Westminster Abbey, culminating at 11pm, the hour at which Britain's entry was confirmed.
14 September – The closing ceremony of the inaugural Invictus Games takes place in London with a music concert at Olympic Park featuring artists and groups such as Bryan Adams, Ellie Goulding, James Blunt and the Kaiser Chiefs.
22 September – The BBC apologises after seven viewers complained about an edition of TOTP2 that aired on 13 September on BBC Two which included a brief clip of Jimmy Savile from a 1971 edition of Top of the Pops. The footage has since been edited out of the programme.
1 October – BBC Two airs the This World documentary, Rwanda's Untold Story which questions official accounts of the 1994 Rwandan genocide.
13 November – The BBC2 "Window on the World" idents is seen for the final time after about 8 years in use. Although elements of it (programme slides) are retained.
27 December – Part One of the Top Gear Patagonia Special is aired on BBC Two and seen by an average audience of 4.7 million viewers. The second part which features the controversial Argentina leg of the programme's visit to South America airs the following day and is watched by an average of 4.8 million viewers.

2015
21 January – The television adaptation of Hilary Mantel's novels Wolf Hall and Bring Up the Bodies debuts on BBC Two to much critical acclaim, but viewers quickly take to social media to complain about the poor lighting in the series.
3 February – Reinventing the Royals, a BBC Two documentary pulled from the 4 January schedule because of concerns over the broadcasting rights of archive footage, is rescheduled for 19 February.
16 February – The BBC unveils a series of new arts programmes which will air in primetime slots. They include a new BBC Two series titled Artsnight and a one off debate, Artists Question Time, presented by Kirsty Wark which will air on BBC Four.
4 March – BBC Two airs the Storyville documentary India's Daughter which includes an interview with the man convicted over the 2012 Delhi gang rape.
17 March – The BBC confirms it has bought the rights to broadcast BT Sport's The Clare Balding Show which will air on BBC Two. The programme makes its BBC Two debut on 3 April.
7 April – BBC News launches a new two-hour weekday current affairs programme called The Victoria Derbyshire Show. The programme is broadcast on both BBC Two and the BBC News Channel. 
9 May – Contemporary dancer Connor Scott wins the inaugural BBC Young Dancer competition, broadcast live on BBC Two.
17 May – BBC Two begins airing The Detectives, a three-part documentary series following investigators at Greater Manchester Police's sex crimes unit. The series, aired over three consecutive nights, focuses on the investigation into historical sex crimes committed by disc jockey Ray Teret and his subsequent trial and conviction for those offences.
17 June – BBC Two airs the first in a series of televised debates ahead of the 2015 Labour Party leadership election which sees the potential candidates hoping to succeed Ed Miliband go head-to-head in front of a studio audience.
28 June – BBC Two airs the final edition of Top Gear to be presented by Jeremy Clarkson, Richard Hammond and James May, a 75-minute compilation of footage shot before the trio quit the show. After its broadcast Clarkson says that he is "so sad and sorry it's ended like this".
5 July – The 2015 FIFA Women's World Cup Final between the United States and Japan is aired on BBC Two. The coverage is watched by an audience of 500,000.
4 October – The BBC admits that a volcanic eruption shown on the first episode of BBC Two's Patagonia: Earth's Secret Paradise was actually footage from two different volcanoes taken four years apart.
2 November – BBC Two debuts Simply Nigella, the first cookery programme to be presented by Nigella Lawson since her personal life was the subject of a high-profile court case. The programme, aired at 8:30pm, attracts 2.3 million viewers (a 10.8% audience share), but proves to be to the detriment of the quiz show Only Connect which was moved forward an hour from its usual slot to make way for Lawson's new show. Having attracted an audience of 2.3 million for its 26 October edition, Only Connects new timeslot sees it garner a viewership of 1.7 million, a drop of 600,000. The show will return to its usual time once Simply Nigella has finished. The first episode of Simply Nigella also becomes the subject of a social media storm after viewers are shown how to make avocado on toast, with many feeling the recipe is too easy.

2016
19 January – BBC One controller Charlotte Moore is appointed to the newly created role of controller of BBC TV channels and iPlayer, while Kim Shillinglaw, current controller of BBC Two and BBC Four is to leave the BBC and her position abolished.
15 February – BBC Two begins airing The People v. O. J. Simpson, the first series in the American true crimes anthology, American Crime Story.
29 May – Top Gear relaunches with Chris Evans as presenter. The episode is seen by an average 4.4 million viewers.
25 June 
Following the EU referendum in which the UK voted to leave the European Union, Newsnight airs a special edition looking at life after Brexit.
Adele headlines the Pyramid Stage at Glastonbury 2016. The set, aired on BBC Two, is watched by a peak audience of 3.7 million, making it the most watched performance to be televised during this year's festival and giving a single Glastonbury set the largest number of viewers since 2008.
1 July – Patrick Holland, current head of documentaries commissioning at the BBC, is appointed to the newly created role of BBC Two channel editor.
11 August – The BBC has signed Gabby Logan to present The Premier League Show, a midweek BBC Two magazine programme focusing on the Premier League, beginning on 25 August. Gary Lineker will also present a slot on the show.
6 September – BBC Two announces that it will dedicate its Saturday night scheduling to the arts from 1 October and throughout the autumn season with programmes about literature, cinema and music.

2017
7 January – BBC Two airs the documentary David Bowie: The Last Five Years on the eve of what would have been the singer's 70th birthday.
3 June – BBC Two airs Sgt Pepper's Musical Revolution with Howard Goodall, a documentary presented by Howard Goodall celebrating the 50th anniversary of the release of The Beatles album Sgt. Pepper's Lonely Hearts Club Band.
13 June – BBC Two airs the documentary Jo Cox: Death of An MP to coincide with the first anniversary of her murder.
15 June – Antibiotics are voted Britain's greatest invention following a live television special, Britain's Greatest Invention on BBC Two.
17 June – Following the Grenfell Tower fire in London, BBC Two pulls the documentary Venice Biennale: Sink or Swim as it features artist Khadija Saye who is believed to be among those to have perished in the blaze. The opening edition of BBC One's singing contest Pitch Battle is also replaced by a different edition after the blaze, a decision taken due to song lyrics.
9 August – The BBC announces that the Radio 4 cultural review programme Front Row will be extended to television and begin airing on BBC Two in September.
18 August – BBC Two have acquired the broadcast rights to The Assassination of Gianni Versace, the second series of the FX true crimes anthology drama series American Crime Story, the series will air in 2018.
4 September – BBC Two airs Diana and I, a film that explores how the death of Diana, Princess of Wales affected ordinary people.
23 September – BBC Two airs the Later...with Jools Holland 25th anniversary special, a concert held at the Royal Albert Hall on 21 September. Acts include Foo Fighters, Paul Weller, Van Morrison, Dizzee Rascal, Gregory Porter, Kali Uchis, Camille, Songhoy Blues and Jorja Smith. The TV version of Front Row makes its debut on the same evening.
26 September – BBC Two airs the Horizon documentary "Being Transgender", a film that looks at what it means to be transgender and what happens when someone undergoes transitioning.
30 September – Launch of Saturday Mash-Up! on BBC Two and CBBC, a new Saturday morning children's TV show that will attempt to recapture the spirit of classic BBC programmes such as Going Live! and Live & Kicking.

2018
17 March – BBC Two announces it will axe Robot Wars for the second time due to a lack of making new action toys until Hexbug reintroduced production rather late, the series having been revived in 2016.
28 May – BBC Two airs a new adaptation of King Lear set in a mytholgised but futuristic present and starring Anthony Hopkins in the eponymous role, as well as Emma Thompson, Emily Watson and Florence Pugh as Lear's daughters.
24 July – The final edition of Daily Politics is broadcast, ending a fifteen-year run as BBC News' flagship weekday politics show.
14 August – BBC Two airs one-off edition of the 1990s comedy sketch show Goodness Gracious Me featuring new material and old and new characters.
28 August – BBC Two confirms that Autumnwatch will air a week of programmes from New England in October to celebrate the US region's colourful autumn.
3 September – The first edition of Politics Live is broadcast.
25 September – BBC Two airs The Flu That Killed 50 Million, a docudrama about the 1918 flu pandemic narrated by Christopher Eccleston.
27 September – BBC Two receives a new set of idents. The Curve idents replace the '2' logo in various ident sets since 1991.
28 October – BBC Two airs a live episode of the anthology series Inside No. 9 to coincide with Halloween.
20 November – The BBC Two programmes Winterwatch, Springwatch and Autumnwatch will be broadcast from the Cairngorms in 2019.
29 November – HD simulcast channels of BBC Two Wales and BBC Two Northern Ireland begin broadcasting.

2019
17 February – BBC Two Scotland closes in preparation for the launch of the BBC Scotland channel. Viewers in Scotland can still watch the national version of BBC Two, with regional content aired by BBC Two Scotland being transferred to the new channel.
24 February – A new BBC Scotland channel launches and replaces BBC Two Scotland.
26 April – BBC Two airs the debut episode of The Looming Tower, a ten-part dramatisation of non-fiction book of the same name that explores the rising threat of Osama bin Laden and al-Qaeda during the years before 9/11.

2020s

2020

29 January – BBC News announces it will shed 450 posts, including roles from Newsnight and BBC Radio 5 Live, as part of £80m worth of savings being made by the BBC.
17 March – The final edition of The Victoria Derbyshire Show is broadcast in order to focus on coverage of the COVID-19 pandemic. The programme had been due to come off air later in 2020 due to funding cuts.

2021

9 April – BBC Two suspends regular programming following the death of Prince Philip, which is announced at midday. Programmes are then cancelled in favour of ongoing news coverage of unfolding events and special programmes paying tribute to the Prince. Among programmes to be cancelled are Gardeners' World. The BBC receives a significant number of viewer complaints about its continuous coverage, which on BBC Two continues until 6am the following morning, and a dedicated form is established to deal with the volume of complaints. Viewer ratings also across the television networks which interrupted their regular schedules, with BBC Two losing two thirds of its audience compared to the same day the previous week.
 20 October – The BBC introduces its new logo, being a modification of a previous one used since 1997. BBC Two also received new logo, being a refreshed version of the previous logo, matching BBC's new graphical identity.

2022
7 March – For a short period, BBC Two broadcasts early evening screenings of BBC One's afternoon soap Doctors, airing the programme four nights a week at 7pm.
 11–21 August – The BBC shows full live coverage of the 2022 European Championships with around 14 hours of live coverage each day. BBC Two shows the majority of the coverage, apart from during the afternoon when the event transfers to BBC One.
8 September – BBC Two simulcasts the live coverage of the death of Queen Elizabeth II. 
9–16 September – Most of BBC One's pre-recorded daytime programmes are shown on BBC Two due to most of BBC One's output being given over to provide live coverage of the Death and state funeral of Elizabeth II.
19 September – BBC Two broadcasts live coverage of the funeral of Queen Elizabeth II with in-vision signing.

2023
April – Nicky Campbell's BBC Radio 5 Live weekday morning show will start to be simulcast on BBC Two and BBC News.

See also
Timeline of BBC One
Timeline of the BBC Television Service
Timeline of non-flagship BBC television channels
Timeline of RTÉ Television

References

Television in the United Kingdom by year
BBC television timelines